The Heirloom Mystery is a 1936 British drama film directed by Maclean Rogers and starring Edward Rigby, Mary Glynne and Gus McNaughton. After being secretly commissioned by a man to create a replica piece of furniture so he can sell the valuable original without his wife knowing, Charles Marriott's firm find themselves under investigation.

It was made at the Nettlefold Studios in Walton, as a quota quickie for distribution by RKO Pictures.

Cast
 Edward Rigby as Charles Marriott
 Mary Glynne as Lady Benton
 Gus McNaughton as Alfred Fisher
 Marjorie Taylor as Mary
 John Robinson as Dick Marriott
 Martin Lewis as Sir Arthur Benton
 Kathleen Gibson as Doris
 Louanne Shaw as Millie
 Bruce Lester as Alf Dene
 H. F. Maltby as Mr. Lewis
 Michael Ripper as Minor role

References

Bibliography
 Chibnall, Steve. Quota Quickies: The Birth of the British 'B' Film. British Film Institute, 2007.
 Low, Rachael. Filmmaking in 1930s Britain. George Allen & Unwin, 1985.
 Wood, Linda. British Films, 1927-1939. British Film Institute, 1986.

External links

1936 films
British drama films
1936 drama films
Films directed by Maclean Rogers
Films shot at Nettlefold Studios
British black-and-white films
1930s English-language films
1930s British films